Sir Edward Hartopp (1572–1655) was an English Member of Parliament.

He was the son of yeoman William Hartopp, of Freeby (Freathby), Leicestershire. He succeeded his brother Thomas in 1604, inheriting thereby the manor of Freeby.

He served in the army as a Captain of Foot in the Low Countries from 1598 to 1599 and was afterwards a captain of militia foot (by 1614 to 1616). In 1614 he bought Buckminster, Leicestershire, which became his seat and was appointed High Sheriff of Leicestershire for 1617–18.

In 1628 he was elected knight of the shire (MP) for Leicestershire and was created a baronet on 3 December 1619. During the Civil War he sided with the Parliamentarians and his estate was seized by the Royalists.

He was buried at Buckminster on 10 January 1655. He had married Mary, the daughter of Sir Erasmus Dryden, 1st Baronet, of Canons Ashby, Northamptonshire. They had five sons and four daughters. His son Edward fought for Parliament as a regimental commander in the Civil War. His daughter, Elizabeth, married Montague Cholmeley (b. 7 Mar 1615).

References

 

 

1572 births
1655 deaths
16th-century English people
Members of the Parliament of England for Leicestershire
People from the Borough of Melton
English MPs 1628–1629
High Sheriffs of Leicestershire
Baronets in the Baronetage of England
Roundheads